Miyahuaxochtzin of Tiliuhcan was a Queen of Tenochtitlan as a wife of King Huitzilihuitl. She was a daughter of King Tlacacuitlahuatzin and sister of Princess Matlalxochtzin and Queen Tlacochcuetzin. She was the mother of Prince Huehue Zaca and aunt of Princes Cahualtzin, Tetlepanquetzatzin, Tecatlapohuatzin, Coauoxtli and Oquetzal. She was also a grandmother of the King Huitzilatzin.

Legacy
A descendant of Miyahuaxochtzin, Hernando Huehue Cetochtzin, was taken along with many other indigenous nobles on conquistador Hernán Cortés's expedition to Honduras, during which he died.

See also
List of Tenochtitlan rulers
Miahuaxihuitl

Sources

External links

Tenochca nobility
Queens of Tenochtitlan
Nobility of the Americas